The Presbyterian Church in Korea (HapDongSeungHoe) is a Reformed Presbyterian denomination founded in 1987 due to a split in the Presbyterian Church in Korea (HapDongBoSu). It subscribes the Apostles Creed and the Westminster Confession. In 2004 it had 10,000 members and 78 congregations, 64 ordained members.

See also 
 Presbyterianism
 Korea

References 

Presbyterian denominations in South Korea
Presbyterian denominations in Asia